Geoffrey Thorne (born January 20, 1970) is an American screenwriter, television producer, novelist and actor.

Biography

Thorne was born in Washington, D.C.  After a successful career as a television actor including portraying police officer Wilson Sweet in the television series In the Heat of the Night from 1988 to 1993, Thorne began writing professionally, winning Second Prize in Simon & Schuster's sixth annual Strange New Worlds anthology with his story "The Soft Room." He went on to publish more stories in several media tie-in anthologies as well as the Star Trek: Titan novel Sword of Damocles.

Other stories he has written include contributions to Flying Pen Press's anthology Space Grunts, MV Media's Steamfunk anthology, and Ellery Queen's Mystery Magazine.

As a screenwriter, Thorne was a writer for season 9 of Law & Order: Criminal Intent, multiple episodes of the Ben 10  and Marvel's Ultimate Spider-Man franchises was a writer on season 3-5 of TNT's Leverage and a writer-producer on the Electric Entertainment's The Librarians.

In 2014 Lion Forge Entertainment and NBC-Universal tapped Thorne to reboot the global fan favorite TV series, Knight Rider in comic book form. Thorne is also the co-creator of Phantom Canyon, an audio drama from Pendant Productions.

In 2017 Marvel Entertainment tapped Thorne to be head writer and showrunner of the animated Avengers series, retitled Avengers: Black Panther's Quest, and in 2019 he became Co-Executive Producer of Ghost, the first spinoff of the STARZ network global smash hit, Power.

Thorne is also a co-founder and writing partner of GENRE 19, a studio he formed with artist Todd Harris in 2008.

The Winterman Project
The Winterman Project is a small press established by Thorne in which he produces shorts, comics and ebooks. Thorne describes it as "a place to play, a place where I could write what I want, make what I want without worrying about clients or editorial oversight." In the end of 2017 he launched "Winterman Comics", a line of comics including an anthology series and a series of titles.

Works

Star Trek

 Strange New Worlds VI (June 2003)
 "The Soft Room"
 Star Trek: Deep Space Nine: Prophecy and Change (September 2003)
 "Chiaroscuro"
 Strange New Worlds 8 (July 2005)
 "Concurrence"
 Star Trek: Voyager: Distant Shores (November 2005)
 "Or the Tiger"

Novels

 Star Trek: Titan: Sword of Damocles (November 2007)
 Winter of the Wild Hunt (October 2010)
 Better Angels (February 2012)
 Galatea's Cross (December 2012)

Comics

 Honor Brigade (Spinner Rack Comics, 2009)
 Prodigal: Egg of First Light (Ape Entertainment, 2010)
 Dark Horse Presents: Journeymen (Dark Horse Comics, 2013)
 Prodigal: Remastered (Trillbent.com, 2013)
 Knight Rider (Lion Forge Comics, 2013)
 Mosaic (Marvel Comics, 2016-2017)
 Solo (Marvel Comics, 2016)
 Winterman Comics (The Winterman Project, 2017)
 Black Panther: Soul of a Machine (Marvel Comics, 2017)
 Menthu: Scarab vs Bull (Black Inc!, 2017)
 Spider-Geddon: George Stacy, the Spider (Marvel Comics, 2018)
 Battlebook: Redjack(Winterman Comics, 2018)
 Battlebook: Pilgrim (Winterman Comics, 2018)
 Battlebook: The Return of Cadre One (Winterman Comics, 2018)
 Marvel's Voices (Marvel Comics, 2020)
 Future State: Green Lantern #1 (DC Comics, 2021)
 Menagerie: Declassified (Myth Division, 2021)
 Future State: Green Lantern #2 (DC Comics, 2021)
 King in Black: Black Panther (Marvel Comics, 2021)
 Truth & Justice: Vixen (DC Comics, 2021)
 Planet of the Symbiotes #2 (Marvel Comics, 2021)
 Infinite Frontier #0 (DC Comics, 2021)
 Green Lantern (DC Comics, 2021-2022)
 Blood Syndicate (Milestone Media, 2022)

Anthologies

 Writers of the Future XXII (finalist, Galaxy Press)
 Red/Shift
  The Adventures of Vale & Mist Phobos Books)
Free Men on a Dyson Sphere
 Baal Breakers
 Triangulation: End of Time (Parsec Ink)
 Eshu & The Anthropic Principle
 Astonishing Adventures Magazine #1 (AAM Publishing, 2008)
 The 3rd Option
 Barren Worlds (Hadley Rille Books, 2008)
 Antiope in Black
 Astonishing Adventures Magazine #3 (AAM Publishing, 2008)
 The Dame Wore a Tesseract
 POW!erful Tales (Peryton Publishing, 2009)
 The Lingering Grief of Twilight
 Full Throttle Space Tales: Space Grunts (Flying Pen Press, 2009)
 Truth Metric
 Words to Music (Michael Wells, 2011)
 Thanks to Captain Go
 Griots: A Sword & Soul Anthology (MVmedia, LLC, 2011)
 Sekadi's Koan
 Ellery Queen's Mystery Magazine (Dell Publishing, 2013)
 The Playlist
 Steamfunk (MVMedia LLC, 2013)
 The Tunnel @ the End of the Light
 Pangaea (Crazy 8 Press, 2015)
 Polo's Finger
 Pangaea II (Crazy 8 Press, 2016)
 Polo's Way
 Pangaea III (Crazy 8 Press, 2020)
 Polo's Shadow
Phenomenons I (Crazy 8 Press, 2021)
The Last Rambler

Collections

 Geoffrey Thorne's Dreamnasium The Winterman Project, 2010)
 The Grim Arcana The Winterman Project, 2010)
 The Price of Salt
 The Cost of Opening
 Fixing Mr. Styx
 Fringe Space The Winterman Project, 2013)
Truth Metric
 Thanks to Captain Go
 Fina Silento
 Dreamnasium Redux (the Winterman project, 2020)

Audio dramas

 Phantom Canyon (Pendant Productions, 2014)
 Dreamnasium Podcast (Winterman Project & Pendant Productions)
 Black Panther: Sins of the Father (Serial Box, 2021)

Filmography

 The Rivals (screen story for Star Trek: The Next Generation)
 Geoffrey Thorne's The Dark (webisode series)
 Law & Order: Criminal Intent (television series, Wolf Films)
 Leverage Season 3 (television series, Electric Entertainment)
 Leverage Season 4 (television series, Electric Entertainment)
 Ben 10: Ultimate Alien (television series, Cartoon Network)
 Leverage Season 5 (television series, Electric Entertainment)
 Ben 10: Omniverse (television series, Cartoon Network)
 The Librarians Season 1 (television series, Electric Entertainment)
 Ultimate Spider-Man: Web Warriors (television series, Disney XD)
 The Librarians Season 2 (television series, Electric Entertainment)
 Niko & the Sword of Light (television series, Amazon)
 Avengers Assemble: Secret Wars (television series, Disney XD)
 Avengers: Black Panther's Quest (Showrunner)(television series, Disney Plus)
 Power: Book II: Ghost (STARZ)
Magnum P.I. (CBS)

References

External links

Living people
1970 births
21st-century American novelists
American male novelists
American science fiction writers
21st-century American short story writers
21st-century American male writers